The 2022 Upper Austria Open was a professional tennis tournament played on clay courts. It was the first edition of the tournament which was part of the 2022 ATP Challenger Tour. It took place in Mauthausen, Austria between 2 and 8 May 2022.

Singles main-draw entrants

Seeds

 1 Rankings as of 25 April 2022.

Other entrants
The following players received wildcards into the singles main draw:
  Gerald Melzer
  Filip Misolic
  Lukas Neumayer

The following player received entry into the singles main draw as an alternate:
  Attila Balázs

The following players received entry from the qualifying draw:
  Nerman Fatić
  Lucas Miedler
  Matej Sabanov
  Nikolás Sánchez Izquierdo
  Alexander Shevchenko
  Máté Valkusz

The following player received entry as a lucky loser:
  Benjamin Hassan

Champions

Singles

 Jurij Rodionov def.  Jiří Lehečka 6–4, 6–4.

Doubles

 Sander Arends /  David Pel def.  Johannes Härteis /  Benjamin Hassan 6–4, 6–3.

References

2022 ATP Challenger Tour
May 2022 sports events in Austria
2022 in Austrian sport
Upper Austria Open